Michele R. Titus is an American politician and jurist from Queens, New York who has served as a New York City Civil Court Judge since January 2020. A Democrat, Titus previously represented District 31 in the New York State Assembly from 2002 to 2020.

Biography
Titus is a lifelong resident of Queens and graduated from John Adams High School. She received a B.A. degree in political science from Binghamton University (State University of New York) in 1990. Titus earned her J.D. from the Albany Law School in 1993 and was admitted to the New York State Bar in 1994.

Prior to her election to the Assembly, Titus served as Chief of Staff to Senator Ada Smith and a Executive Director for the New York State Black and Puerto Rican Legislative Caucus. She had previously been an attorney for the New York City Board of Education. She has also been, at various times, a member of the staff of the Consumer Frauds Bureau of the New York State Attorney General's Office as well as the Integrity Bureau for the Queens County District Attorney's office.

A Democrat, Titus was first elected to the State Assembly in a special election held on April 16, 2002 to replace Assembly member Pauline Rhodd-Cummings, who died while in office. Titus also won the general election that November with 86 percent of the vote. She ran uncontested in the 2008 and 2010 general elections. The district comprised Far Rockaway, Rosedale, Laurelton, Springfield Gardens, South Ozone Park and South Richmond Hill. She served on several standing committees, including Children and Families, Codes, Judiciary, Small Business and Local Governments, among others. In 2017, Titus made headlines when she and her husband, Eric DeBerry, sued the state's Unified Court System. The suit alleged that DeBerry had been wrongfully terminated from his job as a court officer; it included a claim that the defendant's actions had affected the couple's sex life.

On November 5, 2019, Titus was elected as a New York City Civil Court Judge. She took office in January 2020, stepping down from her Assembly seat.

References

External links
New York State Assembly Member Website
Biography: New York State Democratic Committee

Living people
Democratic Party members of the New York State Assembly
Women state legislators in New York (state)
African-American state legislators in New York (state)
Binghamton University alumni
Albany Law School alumni
Year of birth uncertain
21st-century American politicians
21st-century American women politicians
John Adams High School (Queens) alumni
1969 births
21st-century African-American women
21st-century African-American politicians
20th-century African-American people
20th-century African-American women